Tyson Burmeister (born 19 July 1984) is a speedway rider from the United States.

Speedway career
He rode in the top tier of British Speedway for the Wolverhampton Wolves during the 2011 Elite League speedway season.  He started his career riding in California during 2008.

References 

1984 births
Living people
American speedway riders
Wolverhampton Wolves riders